The Rock Island Depot in Lincoln, Nebraska is a historic railroad station which served passenger trains of the Chicago, Rock Island and Pacific Railroad (Rock Island Line) from 1893 to 1966. The station served trains including the Rock Island's Rocky Mountain Rocket (Chicago - Colorado Springs). When the Rocky Mountain Rocket was terminated on October 15, 1966, the Rock Island's passenger service was discontinued west of Omaha. Thus, Lincoln lost its passenger service at that time.

It was listed on the National Register of Historic Places on September 3, 1971. The buildings is now occupied by a branch of Union Bank and Trust. 

Most of the former Rock Island Line trackage in Lincoln has been converted to rail trails.

References 

Railway stations in the United States opened in 1892
National Register of Historic Places in Lincoln, Nebraska
Railway stations on the National Register of Historic Places in Nebraska
Lincoln
Railway stations closed in 1966
1892 establishments in Nebraska
Former railway stations in Nebraska